With All My Might may refer to:
 With All My Might (album), a 1989 album by George Fox
 With All My Might (George Fox song)
 With All My Might (Sparks song)